Artur Varkezovich Minosyan (born 4 August 1989) is a Russian former professional football player of Armenian descent.

Club career
He made his Russian Football National League debut for FC Chernomorets Novorossiysk on 4 April 2011 in a game against FC Gazovik Orenburg.

He made his Russian Premier League debut for FC Volga Nizhny Novgorod on 10 March 2014 in a game against FC Amkar Perm.

External links
 

1989 births
People from Novorossiysk
Living people
Russian footballers
Association football midfielders
FC Chernomorets Novorossiysk players
Russian people of Armenian descent
FC Volga Nizhny Novgorod players
Russian Premier League players
FC Torpedo Moscow players
Armenian footballers
FC Spartak-UGP Anapa players
Sportspeople from Krasnodar Krai